People, States and Fear: The National Security Problem in International Relations was a 1983 work by Barry Buzan. It is one of the foundation texts of the Copenhagen School of security studies. A revised edition of the book was published in 1991 as People, States and Fear: An Agenda for International Security Studies in the Post Cold War Era.

Further reading
Fox, W. Reviewed work(s): People, States, and Fear: The National Security Problem in International Relations by Barry Buzan, International Journal, Vol. 40, No. 4, Managing Conflict (Autumn, 1985), pp. 756–758

Copenhagen School (security studies)
1983 non-fiction books